John Edward "Bags" Bagley (born April 23, 1960) is a former American basketball player in the National Basketball Association (NBA).

College career
Bagley played for Boston College for three seasons, where he averaged nearly 18 points a game and became the first Eagle to earn Big East Men's Basketball Player of the Year honors. He averaged 20.4 points per game during the 1980–81 season, his sophomore year, and led the Eagles to the regular-season championship and NCAA Tournament's Sweet 16. The following year, Bagley scored 21.1 points per game and led Boston College to the Elite Eight of the NCAA Tournament. Bagley also played in the Men's World University Games in 1981, and led the team with 14.8 points per game. He left Boston College after his junior year and entered the 1982 NBA Draft. He was inducted into the Boston College Varsity Club Athletic Hall of Fame in 1995.

On February 25, 2017, Bagley's number 54 was retired at Boston College.

College statistics

|-
| align="left" | 1979–80
| align="left" | Boston College
| 29 || - || - || .481 || - || .722 || 3.1 || 2.2 || 1.5 || 0.0 || 11.8
|-
| align="left" | 1980–81
| align="left" | Boston College
| 30 || 29 || 32.2 || .500 || - || .788 || 3.8 || 3.4 || 1.8 || 0.1 || 20.4
|-
| align="left" | 1981–82
| align="left" | Boston College
| 32 || 31 || 33.3 || .501 || - || .797 || 3.8 || 3.8 || 1.9 || 0.2 || 21.1
|- class="sortbottom"
| style="text-align:center;" colspan="2"| Career
| 91 || 60 || 32.7 || .496 || - || .778 || 3.6 || 3.2 || 1.7 || 0.1 || 17.9
|}

Professional career

Cleveland Cavaliers
Bagley was selected by the Cleveland Cavaliers with the 12th pick of the 1982 NBA draft, and was signed to a three-year contract on September 28, 1982.

He played with the Cavs for five seasons, from 1982 to 1987.

His best season was the 1985–86 season, where Bagley hit then career highs of 11.7 points per game and 9.4 assists per game.

During the 1986–87, Bagley had career highs in both free throw and three point percentage, with .831 and .301, respectively.

New Jersey Nets
After the 1986–87 season, Cleveland traded Bagley to the New Jersey Nets along with Keith Lee for Darryl Dawkins (who was subsequently sent to the Utah Jazz in a three-way deal) and James Bailey. Bagley's first season with the Nets saw him play all 82 games, the only season he did this, as well as score a career high 12 points per game.

He was also the only Net to play 82 games, and as a result, Bagley was given a multiyear extension on September 6, 1988.

On November 17, 1987, Bagley hit a 75-footer at the buzzer against the Houston Rockets when the first quarter drew to a close. 
Bagley played in 68 games, missing some due to injury, and lost his starting position at point guard to Lester Conner.

Boston Celtics
On October 5, 1989, Bagley was traded to the Boston Celtics for two draft choices and an undisclosed amount of cash. He has noted that playing with the Celtics in the Boston Garden has been the highlight of his basketball career.

After playing one season for the Celtics, Bagley did not play the entire 1990–91 season. He began the season on the injured list with tendinitis of the right knee, and received arthroscopic surgery on March 3, 1991, ending his season and even becoming an afterthought, with the Celtics emphasizing Brian Shaw and Dee Brown. However, he did end up starting most of the 1991–92 season, mainly after Brian Shaw was traded to the Miami Heat. Despite the starting role, Bagley was not on the team as the 1992–93 season began, but was re-signed by the Celtics on December 23, 1992. Bagley ended up playing in only 10 games that season, then was granted free agency.

CBA
He played with the Continental Basketball Association (CBA) during the 1993 off-season, playing for the Columbus Horizon and Rochester Renegade.

Atlanta Hawks
Prior to the 1993 season, Bagley signed a free agent contract with the Atlanta Hawks, but was released after three appearances on December 13, 1993.

NBA career statistics

Regular season 

|-
| style="text-align:left;"| 
| style="text-align:left;"|Cleveland
| 68 || 3 || 14.6 || .432 || .000 || .762 || 1.4 || 2.5 || 0.8 || 0.1 || 5.7
|-
| style="text-align:left;"| 
| style="text-align:left;"|Cleveland
| 76 || 19 || 22.5 || .423 || .118 || .793 || 2.1 || 4.4 || 1.0 || 0.1 || 8.9
|-
| style="text-align:left;"| 
| style="text-align:left;"|Cleveland
| 81 || 65 || 29.6 || .488 || .115 || .749 || 3.6 || 8.6 || 1.6 || 0.1 || 9.9
|-
| style="text-align:left;"| 
| style="text-align:left;"|Cleveland
| 78 || 77 || 31.7 || .423 || .243 || .791 || 3.5 || 9.4 || 1.6 || 0.1 || 11.7
|-
| style="text-align:left;"| 
| style="text-align:left;"|Cleveland
| 72 || 67 || 30.3 || .426 || .301 || .831 || 3.5 || 5.3 || 1.3 || 0.1 || 10.7
|-
| style="text-align:left;"| 
| style="text-align:left;"|New Jersey
| 82 || 74 || 33.8 || .439 || .292 || .822 || 3.1 || 5.8 || 1.3 || 0.1 || 12.0
|-
| style="text-align:left;"| 
| style="text-align:left;"|New Jersey
| 68 || 20 || 24.1 || .416 || .204 || .724 || 2.1 || 5.8 || 1.1 || 0.1 || 7.4
|-
| style="text-align:left;"| 
| style="text-align:left;"|Boston
| 54 || 17 || 20.3 || .459 || .056 || .744 || 1.6 || 5.5 || 0.7 || 0.1 || 4.3
|-
| style="text-align:left;"| 
| style="text-align:left;"|Boston
| 73 || 59 || 23.9 || .441 || .238 || .716 || 2.2 || 6.6 || 0.8 || 0.1 || 7.2
|-
| style="text-align:left;"| 
| style="text-align:left;"|Boston
| 10 || 0 || 9.7 || .360 || .000 || .833 || 0.7 || 2.0 || 0.2 || 0.0 || 2.3
|-
| style="text-align:left;"| 
| style="text-align:left;"|Atlanta
| 3 || 0 || 4.3 || .000 || – || 1.000 || 0.3 || 1.0 || 0.0 || 0.0 || 0.7
|- class="sortbottom"
| style="text-align:center;" colspan="2"| Career
| 665 || 401 || 25.7 || .437 || .241 || .779 || 2.6 || 6.0 || 1.1 || 0.1 || 8.7

Playoffs 

|-
|style="text-align:left;"|1985
|style="text-align:left;”|Cleveland
|4||4||42.0||.393||.000||.700||4.0||10.0||2.5||0.0||12.8
|-
|style="text-align:left;"|1990
|style="text-align:left;”|Boston
|5||0||14.0||.533||.000||.750||0.8||3.4||0.8||0.2||3.8
|-
|style="text-align:left;"|1992
|style="text-align:left;”|Boston
|10||10||30.8||.442||.250||.703||2.7||8.5||0.9||0.1||11.1
|- class="sortbottom"
| style="text-align:center;" colspan="2"| Career
| 19 || 14 || 28.7 || .434 || .125 || .706 || 2.5 || 7.5 || 1.2 || 0.1 || 9.5

Personal life
John Bagley resided in Elgin, Illinois, and coached the Harper College Men's Basketball team. He also ran a 32-team high school summer league, worked at a camp at Harper College, and coached the Chicago Dogs, a semi-pro basketball team. Following his time away from Connecticut, he recently moved back to his home of Bridgeport, CT. Bagley now coaches boys basketball at his alma mater, (Bridgeport) Harding High School.

References

External links
John Bagley on TheDraftReview

1960 births
Living people
All-American college men's basketball players
American men's basketball coaches
American men's basketball players
Atlanta Hawks players
Basketball coaches from Connecticut
Basketball players from Connecticut
Boston Celtics players
Boston College Eagles men's basketball players
Cleveland Cavaliers draft picks
Cleveland Cavaliers players
Columbus Horizon players
New Jersey Nets players
Point guards
Rochester Renegade players
Sportspeople from Bridgeport, Connecticut
Warren Harding High School alumni